Kathie is a given name. Notable people with the name include:

 Kathie Kay, Scottish singer
 Kathie Lee Gifford, American singer, songwriter, and actress